The St. Anthony School - Carrollton, Texas is an independent therapeutic school located in Carrollton Texas. The school is one of several private schools in the area. The St Anthony School specializes in Dyslexia, Attention Deficit Disorder, Bi-polar disorder, school phobia, Anxiety, Depression, and Spectrum disorder. The St Anthony School is accredited with the Texas Alliance of Accredited Private Schools. The St Anthony School is listed in D Magazine (owned by American Express)which was “named the ‘Best City Magazine’ in the nation three times by the City and Regional Magazine Association”, as one of the top schools in the Dallas Fort Worth area for children with special needs and specializing in alternative learning.

History 
The St Anthony School was founded in 1998 by Tony Cinquepalmi. The school is run by Tony Cinquepalmi, along with a variety of licensed therapists, experienced special education teachers, and behavioral specialists. Tony Cinquepalmi received his master's degree in Education and also has Bachelor's in Psychology from the University of North Texas. Nathan Lambert, who is the Principal, has a Bachelor's of Psychology from the University of North Texas. Lexie McInerney, who serves as the director of the school's curriculum and diagnostics, has a Master's in Interdisciplinary Studies and Bachelor's in Special Education. Julia Cinquepalmi also has a Master's in Education and a Bachelor's in Psychology from the University of North Texas. 
In the early 1990s, Tony developed the model that would eventually become The St. Anthony School. Early on the model was brought to other settings, including hospitals and private schools, until eventually they branched out to establish The St Anthony School. This model focused on serving The Misunderstood Child by establishing the symptoms and adapting resources to assist with Academic and Learning disorders along with Social and Emotional disorders.

Grades 3-12 
Programming at the St Anthony School is designed for students in third through twelfth grade experiencing academic, social and/or emotional difficulties.

Lower School 
The lower school at St. Anthony's serves grades 3-5. Each student's curriculum is individualized and is based upon academic and cognitive testing with learning styles identified and then an individual plan created. There is a multi-sensory approach to learning that helps to identify any academic weaknesses. Lower school students enjoy instruction in such areas as oral expression, research techniques, expressive writing, drama, science and social studies, critical thinking, Literature/reading, Improvement, Art, Mathematics, Annual Achievement test.

Upper School 
Saint Anthony's upper school consists of grades six through twelve. Each student is placed in an individualized curriculum after testing their abilities and academic needs. Highlights of the College Preparatory Program include; competence in reading, oral and communication skills, competence in basic analytical and reasoning skills, critical thinking to distinguish fact from opinion, knowledge and practices to help conserve the environment, world history and modern affairs.

History 
St. Anthony's was founded in 1998.  Staff consists of licensed therapists, experienced special education teachers, and behavioral specialists.

References

External links 
 Saint Anthony School Website

Schools in Carrollton, Texas
Private K-12 schools in Dallas County, Texas
Educational institutions established in 1998
1998 establishments in Texas